Velma R. Veloria (born October 22, 1950) is a former politician from Washington. Veloria was the first Filipino American as well as the first Asian American woman to be elected to the Washington State Legislature as a member of Washington House of Representatives. She served from 1993 to 2004.

Early life 
On October 22, 1950, Veloria was born in Bani, Pangasinan, Philippines. In 1962, Veloria immigrated to the United States.

Education 
Veloria earned a Bachelor of Science degree in Medical Technology from San Francisco State College.

Career
From 1970 to 1980, Veloria was a Labor Activist. Veloria worked at Office of Professional Employees International Union (OPEIU), IL WU Local 37 (cannery workers), and Service Employees' International Union (SEIU). 
From 1990 to 1991, Veloria worked as a legislative aide to Art Wang who chaired the Finance Committee.

On November 3, 1992, Veloria won the election. In January 1993, Veloria became the first Asian-American woman and first Filipino American to serve as a member of Washington House of Representatives for District 11, and served until 2004.

Awards 
 2019 Curriculum and Community Innovation Scholar. First recipient. Faculty award honored at University of Washington.

Personal life 
Veloria's husband is Alonzo Suson. Veloria and her family live in Seattle, Washington.

References

1950 births
Living people
San Francisco State University alumni
Women state legislators in Washington (state)
Members of the Washington House of Representatives
21st-century American women